Khariar Public School is an Indian primary, middle and secondary school in Khariar, Odisha.

The school provides education up to the 0 grade. It has an ecofriendly environment. It is the first Central Board of Secondary Education-affiliated school of Khariar.
The school periodically conducts tests and competitions to put the potential of children in motion.

History 
The school was initially established on 5 September 1989, due to the efforts by people including Chitrabhanu Singh Deo, Mahesh Gupta and Biswajit Padhi. A management committee was formed to look after the school. Chitrabhanu Singh Deo and Biswajit Padhi were the first vice-president and the secretary of the school, respectively. The management committee also included Mahesh Gupta, Gobind Agrawal and Kedar Saraff.

During the tenure (1993 to 1995) of collector Asit Kumar Tripathy, the management committee acquired a piece of land for the school. The building construction work started with the funds from Subash Nayak, the then-M.P. Kalahandi. Later, the Bikram Kesari Deo, the then-M.P. Kalahandi, Hitesh Bagartti M.L.A. Khariar and the Western Odisha Development Council extended financial help for the extension of the school building. 

The school was affiliated to Central Board of Secondary Education having identification No. 1530089 on the year 2005. The school is managed by a managing committee of Khariar Public School.
Mr. Hemant Kumar Kata Big Role of khariar Public School

Evolution 
Hari Hara Ratha (now deceased) joined the school as the principal soon after his superannuation as a government high school teacher in 2002. He is credited with developing the school in terms of infrastructure, student strength, etc.

See also

 List of schools in Odisha

References

1989 establishments in Orissa
Educational institutions established in 1989
Nuapada district
Primary schools in India
High schools and secondary schools in Odisha